Andrea van de Broeke is a Dutch former cricketer who played as a batter. She appeared in one One Day International for the Netherlands in 1998, against Denmark. Batting at number 7, she scored 1 run in a 62 run defeat.

References

External links

Date of birth missing (living people)
Year of birth missing (living people)
Place of birth missing (living people)
Living people
Dutch women cricketers
Netherlands women One Day International cricketers